St. Mary's Academy of Guagua, commonly referred to simply as SMAG, is a private Catholic coeducational basic education institution administered by the Religious of the Virgin Mary  in Barangay San Roque, Guagua, Pampanga, in the Philippines. The school was established by the RVM Sisters in 1908.

History 
The school was established in 1908 as Colegio del Sagrado Corazon de Jesus, in honor of the Sacred Heart of Jesus. The school was closed when the Sisters were recalled to Manila at the outbreak of World War II in 1941.  The Americans used the school as a hospital but the constant bombing of the Japanese did not spare the building. After liberation, Mo. Emilia Romero, RVM (Vicar General) and some alumnae petitioned the then Superior General Mo. Catalina Dychitan, RVM to re-open the school. In 1955, the petition was granted by the Superior General of the RVM Sisters.   

The Sisters requested the parish priest of Guagua Catholic Church (Immaculate Conception now) to allow them to use the “convento” (now the Rufino Cardinal Santos Building). In 1956, the school was re-opened and it started with Kindergarten and a six-year elementary course, under the roof of the old convent beside the parish church. Both boys and girls were admitted. The elementary course was duly recognized by the government on June 11, 1956. The school assumed a new name, Sacred Heart Academy. 
 
The first year high school was re-opened in June, 1957 and the whole secondary course was duly given recognition by the government on June 13, 1960. It was exclusively for girls. Increase in population paved the way for the addition and improvements of facilities. In 1958, the RVM Congregation bought a lot and a two –story residential house owned by Mr. Martin Gonzales in San Roque. The house became the Sisters’ convent and the adjacent lot became the site of the High School Building. A two-story High School Building was constructed in 1960 and named Sacred Heart Building. The administrative offices were housed on the first floor and the chapel was on the second floor. Upon completion of the building, an imposing statue of the Sacred Heart was constructed in front of the building through the generosity of the alumnae. Other improvements followed: the construction of the Grotto of Our Lady of Lourdes by the members of the Sodality of Our Lady (1962-1963); the construction of the campus gate, the improvement of the garden and the installation of the bust of Doña Carmen Macam Lim in front of the Sisters’ residence. all these were made possible through the generosity of the High School alumnae of 1966-1968.

A fire of mysterious origin reduced the grade school building at the church site into ashes on December 26, 1969. This unfortunate event gave way to the construction of a two-story wooden building at lot formerly owned by the Cancios family in 1970-1971. The elementary grades then transferred to the San Roque Campus in 1971. More improvements followed; a three-story concrete building was constructed in 1988 to house (10) classrooms, the high school faculty room, the library and more of the offices and labs. The building was named after the founder of the RVM, Mother Ignacia.

The eruption of Mount Pinatubo on June 14, 1991 caused much havoc to Guagua and its neighboring municipalities. SMAG opened its doors to the victims. After the eruption, another building was built due to termite infestation of the former grade school building. The school had to borrow money from the congregation to build a new four-story building, named the Assumption Building. It had (20) classrooms, science labs, H.E. room, AVR, faculty, canteen, and comfort rooms and satellite offices.

In the 1996-1997 academic year the school began to accept boys in the first and second year high school level. SY 1998-1999 saw the first high school graduation of boys. Jubilee year 2000 marked another significant event: Sacred Heart Academy was renamed St. Mary's Academy on June 16, 2000 in consonance with the Ignacian bonding of the RVM schools. In response to the growing population and facility needs, another four-storey building was construct at the lot bought from the Cancios. This building was blessed on June 6, 2003 and named the Beaterio Building. It houses most of the offices and laboratories  
namely the guidance office, AVR, speech lab, chapel, library, computer lab, and auditorium, as well as the music department.

To continue improving instruction, SMAG ventured into institutional self-survey for accreditation. The school had its visit in 2003. After passing the accreditation St. Mary's Academy of Guagua is the only PAASCU-accredited school in the West Central District of Pampanga.

References 

Catholic elementary schools in the Philippines
Educational institutions established in 1908
Religious of the Virgin Mary
Schools in Pampanga
1908 establishments in the Philippines